Mark Bernstein has been a member of the University of Michigan Board of Regents since January 1, 2013, with a term expiring January 1, 2029.

Personal life and education
Bernstein earned a BA from the University of Michigan in 1993, and earned a  J.D. and an M.B.A. from that same university in 1996.

Career
During the Clinton Administration, Bernstein served as director of press pool operations. He later worked for Citigroup and The Law Offices of Sam Bernstein. Bernstein was appointed to the Michigan Civil Rights Commission by Governor Jennifer Granholm.

In 2012, Bernstein ran for a seat on the University of Michigan Board of Regents, campaigning on the idea that the cost of college is too high for students. Bernstein took a bus tour of the state, encountering many who were unaware that the position is elected statewide. Bernstein won the race, earning an 8-year term.

Bernstein was encouraged to enter the 2014 Michigan gubernatorial election, and has been mentioned as a potential future statewide candidate.

References

External links

Living people
Michigan lawyers
Michigan Democrats
Regents of the University of Michigan
Ross School of Business alumni
University of Michigan Law School alumni
Year of birth missing (living people)